Inácio Miguel Ferreira dos Santos (born 12 December 1995), known as Inácio Miguel, is a professional footballer who plays as a defensive midfielder or a centre back for Angolan club Petro de Luanda. Born in Portugal, he represents the Angola national team.

Club career
On 28 September 2016, Inácio made his professional debut with Braga B in a 2016–17 LigaPro match against Aves.

On 30 June 2019 Inácio Miguel signed a contract with Liga II club Universitatea Cluj.

On 21 June 2021, he returned to Mafra.

International career
On 22 September 2020, Inácio Miguel was called-up by the senior Angola national football team. He made his debut on 13 October 2020 as a halftime substitution during a friendly match against Mozambique. He won four caps in 2021.

References

External links

Stats and profile at LPFP 

1995 births
People from Torres Vedras
Sportspeople from Lisbon District
Black Portuguese sportspeople
Portuguese sportspeople of Angolan descent
Living people
Angolan footballers
Angola international footballers
Portuguese footballers
Association football defenders
Association football midfielders
C.D. Mafra players
Gil Vicente F.C. players
S.C. Vila Real players
F.C. Felgueiras 1932 players
S.C. Braga B players
FC Universitatea Cluj players
FK Liepāja players
Campeonato de Portugal (league) players
Liga Portugal 2 players
Liga II players
Latvian Higher League players
Portuguese expatriate footballers
Expatriate footballers in Romania
Portuguese expatriate sportspeople in Romania
Angolan expatriate footballers
Angolan expatriate sportspeople in Romania
Expatriate footballers in Latvia
Angolan expatriate sportspeople in Latvia